Soyuz 13 (Union 13) was a December, 1973, Soviet crewed space flight, the second test flight of the redesigned Soyuz 7K-T spacecraft that first flew as Soyuz 12. The spacecraft was specially modified to carry the Orion 2 Space Observatory. The flight, crewed by Pyotr Klimuk and Valentin Lebedev, was the Soviet Union's first dedicated science mission, and was the first mission controlled by the new Kaliningrad Mission Control Center.

Crew

Backup crew

Reserve crew

Mission parameters 
Mass:  
Perigee:  
Apogee: 
Inclination: 51.60°
Period: 89.20 minutes

Mission highlights 
Launched 18 December 1973, the Soyuz 13 crew of Klimuk and Lebedev performed some of the experiments intended for the failed Salyut space stations from the previous year. Unlike Soyuz 12, the craft was equipped with solar panels to allow for an extended mission. Additionally, an orbital module was attached replacing unneeded docking equipment. This module included the Orion 2 Space Observatory (see below).

The crew used a mulispectral camera to measure the atmosphere and pollution. They also tested the Oasis 2 closed ecology system, and harvested protein, yielding 30 times the original biomass. Medical tests were also carried out, including experiments to measure blood flow to the brain.

The crew landed in a heavy snowstorm on 26 December 1973, but were recovered a few minutes later, some 200 km at southwest of Karaganda, Kazakhstan.

During its 8-day mission, Soyuz 13 was in orbit around the Earth at the same time as the U.S. Skylab 4 mission, which had been launched on November 16, and which would remain in orbit until February 8, marking the first time that both the United States and the Soviet Union had crewed missions operating simultaneously.

Orion 2 Space Observatory 
The Orion 2 Space Observatory, designed by Grigor Gurzadyan, was operated by crew member Lebedev. Ultraviolet spectrograms of thousands of stars to as faint as 13th magnitude were obtained by a wide-angle meniscus telescope of the Cassegrain system, with an aperture diameter of 240 mm, an equivalent focal length of 1000 mm, and a 4-grade quartz prism objective. The dispersion of the spectrograph was 17, 28 and 55 nm/mm, at wavelengths of 200, 250 and 300 nm respectively. The first satellite Ultraviolet spectrogram of a planetary nebula (IC 2149 in Auriga) was obtained, revealing lines of aluminium  and titanium - elements not previously observed in objects of that type. Two-photon emission in that planetary nebula and a remarkable star cluster in Auriga were also discovered. Additionally, comet Kohoutek was observed.

See also 

 1973 in spaceflight

References

External links 
 G. A. Gurzadyan, Ultraviolet spectra of Capella, Nature, vol. 250, p. 204, 1974 
 G. A. Gurzadyan, S. S. Rustambekova, Silicon-rich stellar envelope? Nature, vol. 254, p. 311, 1975 
 G. A. Gurzadyan, A. L. Jarakyan, M. N. Krmoyan, A. L. Kashin, G. M. Loretsyan, J. B. Ohanesyan, Space astrophysical observatory Orion-2, Astrophysics and Space Science, vol.40, p. 393, 1976 
 G. A. Gurzadyan, Two-photon emission in planetary nebula IC 2149, Astronomical Society of the Pacific Publications, vol.88, p. 891, 1976 
 H. A. Abt, Spectral types in Gurzadyan's clustering in Auriga, Astronomical Society of the Pacific Publications, vol.90, p. 555, 1978 

Crewed Soyuz missions
1973 in spaceflight
1973 in the Soviet Union
Spacecraft launched in 1973